Prospect Hill is a historic home located at Long Green, Baltimore County, Maryland, United States. It was designed by architect William Thornton and built between 1796 and 1798.  It is a -story Federal style brick house.

Prospect Hill was listed on the National Register of Historic Places in 1973.

References

External links
, including photo from 1972, at Maryland Historical Trust
Prospect Hill, Kanes Road, Long Green, Baltimore, MD at the Historic American Buildings Survey (HABS)

Houses on the National Register of Historic Places in Maryland
Houses in Baltimore County, Maryland
Houses completed in 1798
Federal architecture in Maryland
William Thornton buildings
Historic American Buildings Survey in Maryland
National Register of Historic Places in Baltimore County, Maryland